Sergio Noda Blanco (born 23 March 1987) is a Spanish male volleyball player. He was part of the Spain men's national volleyball team at the 2010 FIVB Volleyball Men's World Championship in Italy. He plays for Emma Villas Siena.

Achievements
 2009 European League – Silver Medal
 2010 European League – Silver Medal
 2011 European League – Silver Medal

References

External links
 
 Sergio Noda Blanco at Lega Pallavolo Serie A
  Sergio Noda Blanco at WorldofVolley

1987 births
Living people
Spanish men's volleyball players
Sportspeople from Havana
Spanish people of Cuban descent
Expatriate volleyball players in Italy
Mediterranean Games medalists in volleyball
Mediterranean Games silver medalists for Spain
Competitors at the 2009 Mediterranean Games